Bei Shizhang (October 10, 1903 – October 29, 2009), or Shi-Zhang Bei, was a Chinese biophysicist, embryologist, politician, and writer. He was an academician at the Chinese Academy of Sciences.

He was born in Zhenhai, Zhejiang province, on October 10, 1903. He was the oldest member of both the Academia Sinica and the Chinese Academy of Sciences at the time of his death. He was the founder, the first chief director and honorary director of the Institute of Biophysics, Chinese Academy of Sciences.

He was a pioneer of Chinese cytology, embryology and the founder of Chinese biophysics. He was considered the "Father of Chinese Biophysics". The asteroid 31065 Beishizhang was named in his honour on the occasion of his 100th birthday. He obtained his doctorate from University of Tübingen in 1928.

Death
Bei Shizhang died in his home in Beijing on October 29, 2009, aged 106.

References

1903 births
2009 deaths
Biologists from Zhejiang
Cell biologists
Chinese biophysicists
Chinese centenarians
Embryologists
Delegates to the 1st National People's Congress
Delegates to the 2nd National People's Congress
Delegates to the 3rd National People's Congress
Delegates to the 4th National People's Congress
Delegates to the 5th National People's Congress
Delegates to the 6th National People's Congress
Educators from Ningbo
Members of Academia Sinica
Members of the Chinese Academy of Sciences
Men centenarians
People's Republic of China politicians from Zhejiang
Physicists from Zhejiang
Politicians from Ningbo
Scientists from Ningbo
Tongji University alumni
Academic staff of the University of Science and Technology of China
University of Tübingen alumni
Academic staff of Zhejiang University